Williams Grand Prix Engineering Limited, currently racing in Formula One as Williams Racing, is a British Formula One team and constructor. It was founded by Frank Williams and Patrick Head. The team was formed in  after Frank Williams' earlier unsuccessful F1 operation: Frank Williams Racing Cars (which later became Wolf–Williams Racing in 1976).

The team's first race was the 1977 Spanish Grand Prix, where the new team ran a March chassis for Patrick Nève. Williams started manufacturing its own cars the following year, and Clay Regazzoni won Williams' first race at the 1979 British Grand Prix. At the 1997 British Grand Prix, Jacques Villeneuve scored the team's 100th race victory, making Williams one of only four teams in Formula One, alongside Ferrari, McLaren, and Mercedes to win 100 races.

Notable drivers for Williams include: Alan Jones, Keke Rosberg, Nigel Mansell, Damon Hill, David Coulthard, Jenson Button, Juan Pablo Montoya, Alain Prost, Nelson Piquet, Ayrton Senna, Riccardo Patrese and Jacques Villeneuve. Of these drivers, Jones, Rosberg, Mansell, Hill, Piquet, Prost, and Villeneuve won the Drivers' title with the team. Of those who have won the championship with Williams, only Jones, Rosberg and Villeneuve defended their title while still with the team; as Piquet moved to Lotus after winning the  championship; Mansell left F1 to compete in the CART series after winning the  championship, Prost retired after winning the  championship, and Hill moved to Arrows after winning the  championship. None of Williams' Drivers' Champions went on to win a championship with another team.

Williams have worked with many engine manufacturers, most successfully with Renault, winning five of their nine Constructors' titles with the company. Along with Ferrari, McLaren, Benetton and Renault, Williams is one of a group of five teams that won every Constructors' Championship between 1979 and 2008 and every Drivers' Championship from 1984 to 2008.

Williams also has business interests beyond Formula One. They have established Williams Advanced Engineering and Williams Hybrid Power, who take technology originally developed for Formula One and adapt it for commercial applications. In April 2014, Williams Hybrid Power was sold to GKN.

In May 2020, Williams announced they were seeking buyers for a portion of the team due to poor financial performance in 2019 and that they had terminated the contract of title sponsor ROKiT. On 21 August 2020, Williams was acquired by Dorilton Capital.

Frank and Claire Williams stepped down from being Manager and Deputy Manager of the team on 6 September 2020, with the 2020 Italian Grand Prix being their last time in their respective positions.

Origins

Frank Williams founded Williams in 1977 after his previous team, Frank Williams Racing Cars, failed to achieve the success he desired. Eventually, Williams left the rechristened Walter Wolf Racing and moved to Didcot to rebuild his team as Williams Grand Prix Engineering. Frank recruited Patrick Head to work for the team, creating the Williams–Head partnership.

Racing history – Formula One

Ford-Cosworth engines (1977–1983)

1977 season
Williams entered a March 761 for the  season.

1978 season

For the  season, Patrick Head designed the first Williams car: the FW06. Williams signed Alan Jones, who had won the  the previous season for a devastated Shadow team following the death of their lead driver, Tom Pryce. Jones's first race for the team was the  where he qualified in 14th position but retired after 36 laps due to a fuel system failure. The team scored its first championship points two races later at the  when Jones finished in fourth. Williams finished the season in ninth place in the Constructors' Championship, with a respectable 11 points, while Alan Jones finished 11th in the Drivers' Championship. Towards the end of 1978, Frank Williams recruited Frank Dernie to join Patrick Head in the design office.

1979 season
Head designed the FW07 for the  season with Frank Dernie picking up the aerodynamic development and skirt design. This was the team's first ground effect car, a technology that was first introduced by Colin Chapman and Team Lotus. Williams also obtained membership of the Formula One Constructors' Association (FOCA) which expressed a preference for teams to run two cars, so Jones was joined at the team by Clay Regazzoni. Regazzoni came close to taking the team's first win but finished second, less than a second behind race winner Jody Scheckter. The next race, the French Grand Prix, is remembered for the final lap battle between René Arnoux and Gilles Villeneuve, but also saw both cars finish in the points for the first time; as Jones was fourth with Regazzoni in sixth.

Greater success followed when Williams got a 1-2 finish at the next round in Germany, Jones in first with Regazzoni two seconds behind in second. Jones then made it three wins in a row at the Austrian Grand Prix, finishing half a minute ahead of Gilles Villeneuve's Ferrari. Three wins in a row became four two weeks later at the Dutch Grand Prix, with Alan Jones winning yet again by a comfortable margin over Jody Scheckter's Ferrari. Alan Jones managed another win at the penultimate race in Canada to cap off a great season.

Williams had greatly improved their Constructors' Championship position, finishing eight places higher than the previous year and scoring 59 more points. Alan Jones was the closest driver to the Ferrari duo of Villeneuve and 1979 champion Jody Scheckter. Jones scored 43 points, 17 points behind Scheckter, while Regazzoni was two places behind him with 32 points.

1980 season
Before the start of the 1980 season, Regazzoni left the team. So, Carlos Reutemann joined the team. Williams started strong in the championship, with Jones winning the first race of the season in Argentina. Jones won four more races: the French Grand Prix, the British Grand Prix, the Canadian Grand Prix and, the last race of the season, the United States Grand Prix. Jones became the first of seven Williams drivers to win the Drivers' Championship, 17 points ahead of Nelson Piquet's Brabham. Williams also won its first Constructors' Championship, scoring 120 points, almost twice as many as second-placed Ligier.

1981 season
Alan Jones won the first race of the season, the United States West Grand Prix, and the final race of the season, the Caesars Palace Grand Prix. Meanwhile, Carlos Reutemann won the Brazilian Grand Prix and the Belgian Grand Prix. Williams won the Constructors' title for the second year in a row, scoring 95 points, 34 points more than second-placed Brabham.

1982 season

This season, Alan Jones retired from Formula One (though he would come back a year later for a single race with the Arrows team). The Australian was replaced by Keke Rosberg, the father of 2016 World Champion Nico Rosberg. Rosberg had not scored a single point the previous year. Rosberg's teammate, Reutemann, finished in 15th place having quit Formula One after just two races of the new season. His seat was filled by Mario Andretti for the United States Grand Prix West; before Derek Daly took over for the rest of the year. Williams finished fourth in the Constructors' Championship that year, 16 points behind first-place Ferrari.

Honda engines (1983–1987)

1983 season
Frank Williams looked towards Honda, who was developing a turbocharged V6 engine with Spirit. A deal between Honda and Williams was settled early in 1983 and the team used the engines for the 1984 season. For the  season however, Williams continued to use the Ford engine except for the last race of the year in South Africa; where Keke Rosberg finished in an impressive fifth place. The team finished fourth in the Constructors' Championship, scoring 36 points. Also, Rosberg won that year's .

1984 season
For the  season, the team ran an FW09. Keke Rosberg won the Dallas Grand Prix and finished in second at the opening race in Brazil. Rosberg's new teammate, Jacques Laffite, came 14th in the Drivers' Championship with five points. The team finished sixth in the Constructors' with 25.5 points, with Rosberg finishing in eighth in the Drivers' Championship.

1985 season

In , Head designed the FW10, the team's first chassis to employ the carbon-fibre composite technology pioneered by McLaren. Nigel Mansell replaced Laffite to partner with Rosberg. Williams finished in third in the Constructors' Championship, scoring 71 points.

This was the fastest recorded lap in Formula One history to that point.

From 1985 until 1993, Williams ran their famous yellow, blue and white Canon livery.

1986 season
In March 1986, Frank Williams faced the most serious challenge of his life. While returning to the airport at Nice, France, after pre-season testing, he was involved in a road accident that left him paralysed. He did not return to the pit lane for almost a year. This left Alain Prost to defend his title successfully, despite being in a slower car.

1987 season

The  season brought the Williams-Honda partnership its first and only Drivers' Championship title in the hands of Nelson Piquet. Piquet won three races and scored 73 points in the Drivers' Championship. His teammate Mansell came in second place with six victories and 61 points. Williams won the Constructors' Championship for the second year in a row, scoring 137 points, 61 points ahead of their nearest rivals, McLaren. Despite this success, Honda ended their partnership with Williams at the end of the year in favour of McLaren.

Judd engines (1988)

1988 season
Unable to make a deal with another major engine manufacturer, Williams used naturally aspirated Judd engines for the  season. This left them with a significant performance deficit compared with their turbo-powered rivals. Piquet left Williams to join Lotus who had retained their Honda engines for the 1988 season, helped by having Satoru Nakajima as number 2 driver to Piquet. Williams brought in Riccardo Patrese to replace Piquet. The team did not win a race that season and finished seventh in the Constructors' Championship, scoring 20 points. The highlights of the season for the team were two second-place finishes by Mansell. When Mansell was forced to miss two races due to illness, he was replaced by Martin Brundle for the first race and Jean-Louis Schlesser for the second.

Renault engines (1989–1997)

The team secured Renault as their engine supplier in 1989. Renault engines subsequently powered Williams' drivers to another four Drivers' and five Constructors' Championships up until Renault's departure from Formula One at the end of 1997. The combination of Renault's powerful engine and Adrian Newey's designing expertise led to the team dominating the sport in the mid-1990s alongside McLaren. Mansell had a record-breaking 1992 season, winning the title in record time and leading numerous races from pole to finish. Some maintain that Williams' FW14 and FW15 were "the most technologically advanced cars that will ever race in Formula One".

1989 season

Boutsen replaced Mansell, who had signed a contract with Ferrari. The engine's first Grand Prix in Brazil was one that the team would prefer to forget: Boutsen retired with an engine failure and Patrese with an alternator failure. Williams managed to get back on track with Boutsen finishing in fourth at the next race in Italy; winning the team three points. Two races later at the Mexican Grand Prix, the team managed to achieve their first podium with the Renault engine, as Patrese finished second, 15 seconds behind Ayrton Sennain first. The next race saw Patrese finish second again, having started from 14th on the grid, with Boutsen finishing in 6th. At the sixth round in Canada, Williams not only scored their first win with the Renault engine but also their first one-two: with Boutsen finishing in first followed by Patrese in second. This won the team 15 points. Williams came second in the Constructors' Championship, scoring 77 points, 64 points behind McLaren. Patrese finished 3rd in the Drivers' Championship with 40 points, 41 points behind second-placed Alain Prost. Boutsen finished 5th in the championship with 37 points after also winning in Australia. Boutsen's win gave Williams the distinction of having won both the first and last Grand Prix of the 1980s.

1990 season
In the  season, Williams kept Patrese and Boutsen as the team's drivers. The team scored 20 fewer points than the previous year and finished fourth in the Constructors' Championship two positions lower than in 1989. In the Drivers' Championship, Boutsen finished sixth with 34 points and Patrese in seventh with 23 points.

1991 season

Boutsen left Williams and joined Ligier at the start of the  season. Replacing him was a returning Nigel Mansell, who had spent the previous two seasons driving for Ferrari. Williams also recruited future 1996 world champion, Damon Hill, as their reserve driver. Williams failed to finish the first Grand Prix of the season, the US Grand Prix, with both drivers retiring due to gearbox problems. Patrese got back on track for the team in the next Grand Prix at Interlagos, coming second behind McLaren's Ayrton Senna. The 1991 San Marino Grand Prix saw both cars retiring yet again: with Mansell crashing and Patrese suffering from an electrical failure. The Monaco Grand Prix saw Mansell finish in the points, coming in second. At the next race, the Canadian Grand Prix, Williams locked out the front row only for Patrese to drop back with gearbox problems and Mansell to retire from the lead on the final lap due to an electrical fault. At the following race in Mexico, Williams achieved a 1–2 finish, with Patrese finishing in first and Mansell finishing in second. Williams then ran a streak of victories, with Mansell winning the French Grand Prix, five seconds ahead of Alain Prost's Ferrari. Mansell then won again at the British Grand Prix; it had been four years since a Briton had won the Grand Prix, Mansell having won it in 1987. Three consecutive victories became four when Mansell won again in Germany, with Patrese about 10 seconds behind him in second place. Senna ended Williams's run of victories by winning in Hungary, finishing five seconds ahead of Mansell. Mansell later won the Italian Grand Prix and the Spanish Grand Prix, while Patrese won the Portuguese Grand Prix after Mansell's race was ruined by a botched pitstop in which only three wheel nuts were fitted. Williams finished second in the Constructors' Championship, scoring 125 points in total, 14 points behind McLaren. Mansell finished second in the Drivers' Championship with 72 points, 24 points behind Senna.

1992 season

Williams took a step up for the  season, keeping their  driver line-up of Patrese and Mansell. Mansell dominated the first round in South Africa, qualifying in pole position and winning the race by 24 seconds from his teammate, Patrese. Nigel Mansell won the next four rounds for Williams, at Mexico City, Interlagos, Catalunya and Imola, Patrese coming second in all but one (the Spanish Grand Prix at Catalunya, where he retired after spinning off). Mansell's five victories in the opening five races was a new record in Formula One. Senna won the next race in Monaco, ahead of both Williams cars, which finished second and third. In the next race, in Canada, both Williams cars retired: Mansell spun off on entering the final corner (he claimed that Senna pushed him off) and Patrese had a gearbox failure. Mansell went on to record four more Grand Prix wins, including at the British Grand Prix. (In the final round, in Adelaide, the two Williams cars again retired, Mansell after Senna violently crashed into the back of him, and Patrese with electrical problems.) Williams won the Constructors' Championship with 164 points, 65 points more than second-place McLaren. Mansell became World Champion, scoring 108 points, with Patrese finishing second with 56 points. Placing first in nine races, Mansell had set a new record for the most wins by a single driver in one year.

Despite this, there looked to be significant upheaval at Williams for 1993. Alain Prost ended his year-long sabbatical from competition following his 1991 firing by Scuderia Ferrari, and Williams was interested in bringing him in. At the same time Ayrton Senna’s contract with McLaren was ending, as was the team's engine contract with Honda, and he had long expressed a desire to pilot one of the Williams machines. Patrese decided to leave the team in the midst of this, joining Michael Schumacher at Benetton. Prost would eventually come to terms, and this would cause a domino effect that reached beyond F1 and into the PPG IndyCar Series as well.

Mansell and Prost had been teammates at Ferrari in 1990, and friction between the two drivers almost led to Mansell retiring from driving altogether after the season. Thus, Mansell had no desire to race with Prost as his teammate again and decided to take his driving acumen elsewhere. As it so happened, A seat was opening up at Newman/Haas Racing in the IndyCar Series as Michael Andretti, the 1991 series champion, was joining the Formula One World Championship for 1993 replacing Gerhard Berger at McLaren. Mansell, thus, signed to drive for Newman/Haas alongside Michael's father Mario Andretti.

As noted above, McLaren was also losing its Honda engine supply at the end of the 1992 season. Senna had been hoping the team would be able to get a supply of engines from Renault, and when they were not able to convince Renault to do so Senna decided to approach the Williams organisation with an offer to drive in Patrese's old ride and do so without collecting a salary. However, as part of the terms of the contract he signed with Williams, Prost was given power of veto over whom the team would employ as his teammate. He refused to drive alongside Senna again, since he still had issues with him stemming from their time together at McLaren. Senna, who criticized Prost for the decision, would eventually return to McLaren for one final year driving Ford-powered machines, doing so on a race-to-race basis for the entire season. Meanwhile, Williams promoted Damon Hill to replace Patrese in their other entry.

1993 season
The Williams FW15C was an extremely dominant car, with active suspension and traction control systems beyond anything available to the other teams. Prost won on his debut for the team in South Africa and, like Mansell, dominated the weekend, taking pole position and finishing a minute ahead of Senna, who was second. The next Grand Prix in Brazil saw Prost collide with Christian Fittipaldi's Minardi in the rain on lap 29, while Hill went on to his first podium finish: second, 16 seconds behind Senna. Prost won three of the next four Grands Prix for Williams, Senna winning the other race. Prost and Hill later scored a 1–2 in France: the only 1–2 of the season for Williams. Prost won the next two Grands Prix at Silverstone and Hockenheim. Hill proved competitive especially in the second half of the season. Mechanical problems cost Hill leads in Britain and Germany, but he went on to win the next three Grands Prix at Hungary, Belgium and Italy which moved him to second in the standings, as well as giving him a chance of taking the Drivers' title. After Italy, Williams would not win a Grand Prix for the rest of the season, as a young Michael Schumacher won the following race in Portugal, and Senna took Japan and Australia to overtake Hill in the points. Williams retained their Constructors' title, 84 points ahead of second-placed McLaren. Prost clinched the Drivers' Championship in Portugal and finished the season 26 points ahead of second-placed Senna.

Based on his victory in the 1992 World Championship, Mansell would have been issued car number 1 for the 1993 season, and his teammate issued number 2. However, Mansell's move to the IndyCar series meant that number 1 was not issued; instead, the team was issued the number 0, which was placed on Hill's car, while Prost was issued number 2.

1993 marked the final season that Williams ran with Canon as its primary backer.

1994 season

During the  season, Williams used FW16 (developed during the pre-season) and FW16B (with shorter sidepods and optimised for the revised floor regulations which were introduced during the season).

Unlike in the 1992 offseason, Williams was able to sign Ayrton Senna. The previously mentioned veto power written into Alain Prost's contract was only good for the 1993 season, and thus Senna was free to join Williams for 1994 if he so desired. Now that he was free and clear to do so without any sort of interference, and that McLaren was going through further issues with engine suppliers, Senna finally was able to fulfil his desire to drive for the two-time defending F1 championship team. Prost decided to go out on top, as shortly after Senna signed he announced his retirement from motorsports.

Given this was the same team that had won the previous two World Championships with vastly superior cars, Senna was a natural and presumptive pre-season title favourite, with second-year driver Damon Hill intended to play the supporting role. Between them, Prost, Senna, and Hill had won every race in 1993 but one, which was taken by Benetton's Michael Schumacher.

As with 1993, Williams' cars were issued numbers 0 and 2, following Prost's victory in the 1993 championship and subsequent retirement.  Hill retained the number 0, while Senna's car was issued number 2.

Pre-season testing showed the FW16 had speed but was difficult to drive. The Fédération Internationale de l'Automobile (FIA) had banned electronic driver's aids, such as active suspension, traction control and ABS, to make the sport more "human". It was these technological advancements that the Williams chassis of the previous years had been built around. With their removal in 1994, Williams had not been a good-handling car, as observed by other F1 drivers, having been seen to be very loose at the rear. Senna himself had made numerous comments that the Williams FW16 had quirks that needed to be ironed out. It was obvious that the FW16, after the regulation changes banning active suspension and traction control, exhibited none of the superiority of the FW15C and Williams FW14B cars that had preceded it. The surprise of testing was Benetton-Ford which was less powerful but more nimble than the Williams.

The first four rounds were won by Michael Schumacher in the Benetton-Ford. Senna took pole in the first two races but failed to finish either of them. In the third race, the 1994 San Marino Grand Prix in Imola, Senna again took pole position, but was involved in a fatal crash at the second corner after completing six laps. The repercussions of Senna's fatal accident were severe for the team itself, as the Italian prosecutors tried to charge the team and Frank Williams with manslaughter, an episode which was not over until 2005. At the next race in Monaco, Damon Hill was the only Williams on the grid, as a mark of respect to Senna, and retired on the first lap. Since Senna's death, every Williams F1 car has carried a Senna 's' on its livery in his honour and to symbolise the team's ongoing support of the Instituto Ayrton Senna, but cars from 2022 onwards will not have the Senna S, with CEO Capito stating it was time to "move on".

At the next race in Spain, Williams brought in test driver David Coulthard as Hill's new teammate. Hill took the team's first victory of the season, by almost half a minute over Schumacher's Benetton, while Coulthard would retire due to an electrical problem. In Montreal, both Williams cars finished in the points for the first time that season, with Hill finishing second and Coulthard finishing fifth. In France, Nigel Mansell replaced Coulthard (in the first of four appearances), at the behest of Renault. At Silverstone, Damon Hill accomplished what had eluded his father, twice Formula One World Champion Graham Hill, by winning the British Grand Prix. Hill closed the points gap with Schumacher, who was disqualified from first at Spa after the Stewards found floorboard irregularities on his Benetton. He was banned for the next two races, and Hill capitalised on this with wins in Italy and a Williams 1–2 in Portugal.

With three races left, 1992 champion Nigel Mansell returned from CART (where the season had concluded) to replace Coulthard for the remainder of the season. Mansell would get approximately £900,000 per race, while Hill was paid £300,000 for the entire season, though Hill remained as lead driver.

Schumacher came back after his suspension for the European Grand Prix, which he won by about 25 seconds, to take a lead of 5 points into the penultimate round in Japan. The race in Japan was held in torrential rain, with Hill managing to win the restarted race, by three seconds on aggregate over Schumacher who finished second. Going into the final round at Adelaide, Schumacher led Hill by a single point. Mansell took pole for Williams but had a poor start which let Hill and Schumacher through to fight for the lead and the 1994 title. Midway through the race, Schumacher's perceived need for a low downforce setup cost him, as he lost control and clipped the outside wall at the 5th corner (out of sight of Hill). As Schumacher recovered, Hill came around the corner and attempted to overtake into the next corner. Schumacher turned in and the resulting contact (Schumacher in the wall and Hill retiring with bent suspension), meant Schumacher was the champion. This collision has been controversial. Some, such as Williams's Patrick Head, have suggested that this was a deliberate attempt by Schumacher to take Hill out of the race. Others, such as then BBC commentator Murray Walker, defended Schumacher, calling the accident a "racing incident". Meanwhile, Nigel Mansell won the last Grand Prix of his career here, driving the second Williams car.

Williams would end the season as Constructors' Champion for the third consecutive year, scoring 118 points, while Hill finished second in the Drivers' Championship with 91 points.

1995 season

In , Nigel Mansell was not retained, Williams favouring Coulthard over him to partner Hill. Schumacher, whose Benetton team had switched engine suppliers from Ford to Renault in the off-season, won the first round in Brazil, with Coulthard taking second. However, both were disqualified from the race after it was found that Elf supplied their teams with a type of fuel for which samples had not been provided to the FIA. Thus, Gerhard Berger and Ferrari were declared winners. Schumacher and Coulthard had their positions reinstated after appeal, though Benetton and Williams were not awarded their Constructors' points. Hill won the next two races in Argentina and San Marino and would later win races at The Hungaroring and in Adelaide. Hill won two laps ahead of the field at Adelaide in one of F1's most dominating victories. Coulthard recorded his only 1995 win for the Williams team at Estoril, before moving to McLaren.

Williams's champion streak was ended by Benetton, who elected to switch engine suppliers from Ford to Renault, the same as Williams. As such, Benetton outscored Williams by 29 points in the Constructors' Championship. Damon Hill placed second in the Drivers' Championship, 33 points behind Benetton's Michael Schumacher.

1996 season

For , Williams had the quickest and most reliable car, the FW18. Coulthard had left Williams to join Mika Häkkinen at McLaren, and Williams replaced him with Canadian Jacques Villeneuve, who had won the CART series title in 1995, while Hill remained with the team. Schumacher left Benetton to join Ferrari. Williams won the first five Grands Prix, Hill winning all but one of them. Olivier Panis would take victory at the sixth round in Monaco after both Williams cars retired. Hill would retire for the second time in a row after he spun-off in Spain, while his teammate, Villeneuve, took third place. Hill and Villeneuve dominated the next Grand Prix in Canada, with a 1–2 in qualifying and a 1–2 finish. Williams made it a second 1–2 after Hill won the French Grand Prix. Villeneuve won his second race in F1 at Silverstone after Hill retired with a wheel bearing failure on lap 26. Hill was victorious in the next Grand Prix in Germany while Villeneuve won the race after that in Hungary. Schumacher's Ferrari would then take the next two Grands Prix at Spa-Francorchamps and Monza. Villeneuve mounted a title challenge going into the final race of the season at Japan, but Hill reasserted his dominance to take the race and the 1996 title, while Villeneuve lost a wheel and retired.

Williams's dominance was such that they had clinched the Constructors' Championship and only their drivers had a mathematical chance of taking the title, several races before the season concluded. Around that time, Frank Williams announced that Hill would not be re-signed after his contract expired, despite Hill's successes and eventual Drivers' Championship, so he joined Arrows for 1997. Adrian Newey had ambitions as a technical director (rather than just chief designer), but this was not possible at Williams, as Patrick Head was a founder and shareholder of the team. McLaren lured Newey away, though he was forced to take garden leave for the majority of 1997.

1997 season
For what would be the final season of Williams-Renault and a car designed with Newey's input, Frank Williams brought in German Heinz-Harald Frentzen, who had created a good impression on Williams during his first few seasons in Formula One. Frentzen proved to be a disappointment though, and won only one race in two years with Williams, the 1997 San Marino Grand Prix. Jacques Villeneuve won seven races during 1997, compared to five wins by his main rival, Michael Schumacher of a resurgent Ferrari. Williams also achieved the 100-race-win milestone at the British Grand Prix. Coming to the final round of the season at Jerez, Schumacher led Villeneuve by 1 point; however, on lap 48, Schumacher and Villeneuve collided. Schumacher was disqualified from second place in the championship as the accident was deemed by the FIA as "avoidable". Williams won the Constructors' title for the second time in a row, scoring 123 points. Jacques Villeneuve won the Drivers' Championship by three points to Michael Schumacher, who kept his points total despite being removed from second place; thus, runner-up went to Frentzen with 42 points.

Mecachrome engines (1998)

1998 season

After 1997, the team was unable to maintain their dominance in Formula 1 as Renault ended their full-time involvement in Formula 1, and Adrian Newey moved to the rival team, McLaren. Williams then had to pay for Mecachrome engines, which were old, rebadged Renault F1 engines. This meant that the FW20 not only featured a very similar aerodynamic package to their 1997 car but also virtually the same engine, leading some to comment that they ran what was virtually the same car, adjusted for the 1998 regulations. There were changes on the sponsorship front, as Rothmans opted to promote their Winfield brand, replacing the popular blue and white livery with a red one. For , Williams kept both drivers from the previous season, the first time since  that a reigning world champion remained driving for the team. While Ferrari and McLaren battled for the Constructors' and Drivers' titles, Williams fell to the middle of the field. The team won no races and took only 3 podiums during the season, with Frentzen finishing in third at the first round in Australia and Villeneuve finishing third in Germany and Hungary. Williams finished third in the Constructors' Championship, scoring 38 points, while Villeneuve finished fifth in the Drivers' Championship with 21 points, and his German teammate, Frentzen, finished 4 points behind him in seventh.

Supertec engines (1999)

1999 season

In , Williams employed the Supertec engine, which was a rebadged Mecachrome-Renault unit, and a new driver line-up. Villeneuve moved to the new British American Racing (BAR) team, while Frentzen moved to Jordan trading places with fellow German Ralf Schumacher who joined Williams.  To replace Villeneuve, Williams signed Italian Alex Zanardi, who after an unsuccessful F1 career in the early 1990s had been racing in the CART series, winning two series championships and a total of fifteen races in his three years. As with Schumacher a driver trade was made, where Zanardi would join Williams and the team's test driver at the time, Juan Pablo Montoya, would join CART in Zanardi's car for Chip Ganassi Racing.

The team managed three podiums, all scored by Ralf Schumacher, with third place in Australia and Britain and a second place in Italy. Zanardi, meanwhile, struggled through the entire season and failed to finish in the points at any race. Due in large part to this, the team finished fifth in the Constructors' Championship, the lowest finish for Williams in the 1990s; the team finished behind Stewart and Jordan, with Schumacher scoring all of the team's 35 points.

After the season, deciding the relationship was not working, Zanardi's contract with the team was terminated by mutual agreement. He would eventually return to CART in 2001.

BMW engines (2000–2005)

In 1998, the team signed a long-term agreement with German manufacturer BMW to supply engines and expertise for a period of 6 years. As part of the deal, BMW expected at least one driver to be German, which led to the team's signing of Ralf Schumacher for the subsequent season. In 1999, the team had a Williams car with a BMW engine testing at circuits, in preparation for a debut in the  season.

There were major sponsorship changes for 2000–2005, as Rothmans International had been purchased in 1999 by British American Tobacco (BAT), which owned British American Racing and chose not to renew Rothmans' contract with Williams. BMW paid for Williams cars to be entirely in blue and white – unlike the standard motorsport livery scheme, dominated by the colours of the team or major sponsors with the logos of minor sponsors in their own colour schemes. Williams' second major sponsor became Compaq, and following Compaq's acquisition the team debuted Hewlett-Packard (HP) sponsorship at the 2002 British Grand Prix. In a cross-promotion of this technological partnership, a worldwide television commercial featured drivers Ralf Schumacher and Juan Pablo Montoya seemingly driving their BMW Williams cars around a track by radio control from a grandstand.

The new "clean" image allowed Williams to sign a cigarette anti-craving brand, Niquitin, and Anheuser-Busch, alternating with the Budweiser beer brand and SeaWorld Adventure Parks, in compliance with trademark disputes or alcohol bans.

2000 season
To replace Zanardi, Britain's Jenson Button made his series debut. The first season of Williams' partnership with BMW did not yield a single victory, but they managed to get on the podium three times, with Ralf Schumacher responsible for all three. Williams finished third in the Constructors' Championship, with 36 points, one more than the prior year. Ralf Schumacher finished fifth in the Drivers' Championship, while Button, in his debut season, finished in eighth. Button made scrappy mistakes in early races (Monaco, Europe), but overall made an impressive debut in Melbourne, and continued to impress, notably at Silverstone, Spa, and Suzuka.

2001 season

In , the arrangement between Williams and Ganassi came to an end, and thus Williams was able to bring Juan Pablo Montoya back to drive full-time for the team. He was returning after two successful years in CART, where he succeeded Zanardi as champion for 1999 and won ten races total; he also had become the first CART driver since the infamous 1996 split of American open-wheel racing to win the Indianapolis 500, doing so in 2000.

Since Montoya was returning to Williams, this left Jenson Button as the odd man out. He would move over to Benetton, which was still running rebadged Renault engines, for what was the team's final season under that name.

The FW23 won four races, three by Ralf Schumacher at Imola, Montreal, and his home Grand Prix in Germany. His teammate, Montoya, was victorious at Monza, and would have won a few more races if not for the FW23's unreliability and pit crew blunders. The car proved to be quicker than the Ferrari and McLaren counterparts in several races, but Williams's 2001 campaign only yielded third place in the Constructors' Championship.

2002 season
Williams maintained their driver line-up for the  season. The team only won one race, which was at Malaysia, one of only 2 races not won by Ferrari in a year dominated by the Ferraris of Michael Schumacher and Rubens Barrichello.  Despite Montoya qualifying on pole for 7 races, he ended up having a winless season. Williams did improve on their Constructors' Championship position, finishing in second. Montoya finished third in the Drivers' Championship, eight points ahead of Ralf Schumacher, who finished fourth.

2003 season

 would see Williams come closest to winning its first title since 1997. During pre-season, Frank Williams was very confident that the FW25 would challenge for the title. The team won four races, with Montoya winning at Monaco and Germany, while Ralf Schumacher won at the Nürburgring and the following race at Magny-Cours. Montoya stayed in contention for the Drivers' Championship during the season, and finished third, 11 points behind Michael Schumacher, while Ralf Schumacher finished fifth, 24 points behind Montoya. Williams finished second in the Constructors' Championship, two points ahead of McLaren.

2004 season

At the start of the  season, it was announced that Montoya would be moving to McLaren in 2005. The team began the season with a radical nose-cone design, known as the "Walrus-Nose", that proved uncompetitive and was replaced by a more conventional assembly in Hungary. Ferrari dominated for a third consecutive season, winning 15 of the 18 races. Williams picked up a win at the final race in Brazil, with Juan Pablo Montoya finishing one second ahead of Kimi Räikkönen's McLaren; this remained Williams's last F1 win until the 2012 Spanish Grand Prix. Another low part of the season was when both Williams and Toyota were disqualified from the Canadian Grand Prix after it was discovered that both cars had brake irregularities, the brake ducts seemingly not conforming to regulations. Williams finished the season in fourth, scoring 88 points and finishing on the podium six times, while Montoya was the highest-placed Williams driver that year, scoring 58 points to finish in fifth position.

2005 season

For the  season, Schumacher moved to Toyota, while Montoya moved to McLaren. Taking their places were Australian Mark Webber and German Nick Heidfeld. Jenson Button was to have driven for Williams in 2005, but an FIA ruling forced Button to remain with his current team, BAR. Antônio Pizzonia served as the test driver for the team during the 2005 season. Meanwhile, Button signed a contract to drive for Williams in 2006.

During the course of the 2004 and 2005 F1 seasons, BMW Motorsport and director Mario Theissen increasingly became publicly critical of the Williams F1 team's inability to create a package capable of winning the Constructors' Championship, or even multiple victories within a single season. Williams, on the other hand, blamed BMW for not producing a good enough engine. Williams's failed attempt to prise Jenson Button out of his BAR contract may also have been an issue with Theissen. Despite Frank Williams's rare decision to capitulate to commercial demands by employing German driver Nick Heidfeld when he allegedly preferred Antônio Pizzonia, the fallout between Williams and BMW continued through the 2005 Formula One season. Despite BMW's contract with Williams to supply engines until 2009, this public deterioration of the relationship between Williams and BMW was a factor in the decision by BMW Motorsport to buy Sauber and rebrand that team to feature the BMW name.

Cosworth engines (2006)

2006 season
 
Despite having signed a contract to race for Williams, Jenson Button decided to stay with BAR for 2006 as it was to become a Honda works team. In September 2005 a deal was reached to allow Button to remain with BAR, with Williams receiving around £24m, some of it paid by Button himself, to cancel this contract.

Williams and Cosworth entered a partnership agreement where Cosworth would supply engines, transmissions and associated electronics and software for the team. Major sponsors Hewlett-Packard concluded sponsorship agreements one year before their official end of contract. The Williams team also switched to Bridgestone tyres.

The season started well, with both drivers scoring points in the opening race of the season, and Nico Rosberg setting the fastest lap at the Bahrain Grand Prix. The rest of the season was disappointing for Williams, with 20 retirements out of 36 starts for the two cars. The team failed to finish on the podium all season, the first time this had happened since Williams's debut season in 1977. The team eventually finished eighth in the Constructors' Championship, with only 11 points.

Toyota engines (2007–2009)

2007–2009 seasons

Following Williams's worst points tally since , the team announced that Japanese manufacturer Toyota would be supplying the engines for the  season. In addition, the Toyota engine customer deal also included Magneti Marelli Step 11 engine control unit (ECU) systems as it was used by works Toyota team. A number of other changes were announced for 2007: Alexander Wurz, who had been a test driver at Williams since 2006, became the team's second driver to replace the outgoing Mark Webber; Japanese driver Kazuki Nakajima, son of Satoru, replaced Wurz as a test driver alongside Karthikeyan. Sponsorship saw a change in 2007, as it was announced that AT&T would become the title sponsors for the team from the upcoming season. AT&T was previously involved as minor sponsors with the Jaguar and McLaren teams but moved to Williams following McLaren's announcement of a title sponsorship deal with Vodafone, a competitor of AT&T. On 2 February, the new FW29 was presented to the media in the UK. Soon afterwards, the team secured a sponsorship deal with Lenovo who built the team's new supercomputer.

Rosberg and Wurz gave Williams a more productive season in terms of points and, in Montreal, Wurz scored the team's first podium finish since Nick Heidfeld's second-place at the 2005 European Grand Prix. Over the course of the year, Rosberg was consistently in the points, scoring 20 during the season; in comparison, teammate Wurz finished in the points three times. Following the announcement that Wurz would be retiring from the sport, Williams brought in their young test driver Nakajima to drive the second car for them in the final race in Brazil. The Japanese driver finished in tenth despite starting from near the back of the grid, while Rosberg enjoyed his best race of the season, finishing in fourth. Williams finished fourth in the Constructors' Championship that year.

For the  season, Williams confirmed Nico Rosberg and Kazuki Nakajima as their race drivers. During the Winter testing sessions, the team ran six different liveries to celebrate their 30th year in the sport and their 500th Grand Prix.

The 2008 season was a mixture of success and disappointment for Williams. While Rosberg managed to obtain 2 podiums in Australia and Singapore, the team struggled at circuits with high-speed corners. The fact that the team was one of the first to switch development to their 2009 car (when new regulations came in) also hindered their season and Williams finished a disappointing 8th in the Constructors' Championship. Rosberg stated that unless the team was more competitive in the near future, he would look to drive elsewhere. Williams retained Rosberg and Nakajima for the 2009 season.

Frank Williams had admitted that he had regretted parting with BMW but stated that Toyota had a tremendous ability to become a top engine supplier. Speculation had been surrounding Toyota's future on the Formula 1 grid. This was due to the fact that for a big-budget team, Toyota had only managed second place as their best result. In December 2008, Williams confirmed their commitment to F1 following the Honda withdrawal announcement.

Ahead of the 2009 Brazilian Grand Prix, Williams announced that it would be ending its three-year partnership with Toyota and finding a new engine supplier for 2010.

Return to Cosworth engines (2010–2011)

2010–2011 seasons

After the termination of their Toyota contract, Williams announced that from the  season they were to enter into a "long-term partnership" with Cosworth, and would be using an updated version of the CA V8 engine which powered their cars in 2006. Williams also announced a complete driver change for the 2010 season. Rubens Barrichello joined from 2009 Constructors' Champion Brawn GP, whilst GP2 champion Nico Hülkenberg graduated from the test driver seat. Replacing Hülkenberg in the test seat was Finland's Valtteri Bottas, who finished third in the 2009 Formula Three Euroseries as well as winning the non-championship Masters of Formula 3 event at Zandvoort.

Their new 2010 car, the Williams FW32, was unveiled for the first time at a shakedown test at Silverstone. Its first official test was on 1 February at Circuit Ricardo Tormo in Valencia. Hülkenberg was dropped from the team ahead of the  season, and replaced by Venezuelan newcomer and reigning GP2 Series champion Pastor Maldonado. The combination of Barrichello and Maldonado meant that 2011 would be the first time since 1981 that Williams would start a season without a European driver in their line-up.

At the second pre-season test in Jerez, Barrichello posted the fastest time of the week on the last day. That was to no avail as Williams endured one of their worst seasons to date: two ninth places for Barrichello and one tenth place for Maldonado were their best results during the entire year. After Brazil, the team ended with a ninth place in the Constructors' Championship.

Return to Renault engines (2012–2013)

2012–2013 seasons

On 4 July 2011, Williams announced they would be reuniting with engine-supplier Renault who were to supply the team's engines from 2012 onwards. On 1 December 2011, it was confirmed that Maldonado would be retained for the 2012 season, along with reserve driver Valtteri Bottas, who took part in 15 Friday practice sessions. In January 2012, it was confirmed that Bruno Senna would be the driver to partner Maldonado, effectively ending Rubens Barrichello's F1 career.

Prior to the 2012 season, Patrick Head moved from the Williams F1 team to Williams Hybrid Power Limited, another subsidiary of Williams Grand Prix Holdings. The team also announced that its relationship with AT&T ended by mutual agreement, and there were negotiations with another telecommunications company for team's title sponsorship. At the 2012 Spanish Grand Prix, Pastor Maldonado took his only Grand Prix victory, which was also Williams's first race victory since 2004 Brazilian Grand Prix. Around 90 minutes after celebrating this win, a fire broke out in the garage of the Williams team, damaging the FW34 of Bruno Senna and leaving several injured. The team eventually achieved eighth position in the Formula One World Constructors' Championship.

Claire Williams, the daughter of team principal Frank Williams, was appointed deputy principal in March 2013. The team struggled throughout the season, despite a good qualifying session at the Canadian Grand Prix and a place in the top 10 at the United States Grand Prix, scoring only five points in the World Constructors' Championship.

While Williams enjoyed a victory in the 2012 season and occasional points finishes, they did not reach the same heights as was achieved during their domination of Formula One during the 1990s. This, combined with an absolutely dismal 2013 season, prompted Williams to look for a new engine supplier from the 2014 season onwards.

Mercedes power units (2014–present)

2014–2017 seasons

In May 2013, Williams signed a long-term contract with Mercedes to supply engines for the team, the German manufacturer providing 1.6-litre V6 turbo engines from the start of the 2014 season. The team also unveiled a new, multi-year title sponsorship deal with drinks brand Martini. As part of the deal, the team became Williams Martini Racing, except in Bahrain, Russia and Abu Dhabi, where the team is known as Williams Racing because of alcohol advertising restrictions.

With Bottas qualifying alongside Massa, it was also the first time the team had locked out the front row since the 2003 German Grand Prix. The team enjoyed an upturn in performance, including a double podium in Abu Dhabi, resulting in them taking third place in the Constructors' Championship. They repeated this feat in the  season, despite a low-key season owing to the resurgence of Ferrari.
The team went into the  season with Bottas and Massa retained. Former Ferrari Driver Academy member Lance Stroll joined the team as a development driver; Alex Lynn became a reserve driver with Paul di Resta who was announced on 13 March, following Susie Wolff's retirement from motorsport.

Following Nico Rosberg's decision to retire, the team released Bottas from his contract to allow him to take his place at Mercedes, with Massa returning to the team on a one-year deal.

Massa was forced to withdraw from the 2017 Hungarian Grand Prix due to illness; the team then announced that Paul di Resta would be racing alongside Stroll instead.

2018–2019: Continued decline
On 4 November 2017, Felipe Massa announced his decision to retire from F1.

Williams struggled over the course of the 2018 season, scoring only 7 points and finishing last in the Constructors' Championship standings. Although the FW41 rarely suffered from reliability issues, it was significantly off the pace; the team's highest finish was Stroll's 8th-place finish in Azerbaijan. This was also the only Grand Prix of the season in which the team reached the third qualifying session, with Stroll starting 10th on the grid.

On 27 February 2018 Martini announced that they would leave Williams and Formula One at the end of the 2018 season.
On 12 October 2018, the team announced that reigning Formula 2 champion George Russell would be joining the team for the  season. On 22 November 2018 it was announced that reserve driver Robert Kubica would be promoted to the other seat, marking his return to Formula One after eight years away from the sport due to injury. For the 2019 season, the team entered into a partnership with Polish petroleum company PKN Orlen and a multi-year title sponsorship arrangement with telecommunications company ROKiT.

Williams missed the first two-and-a-half days of pre-season testing in Barcelona due to the FW42 not yet being ready, the only team to suffer such a setback. Williams began the season out of reach from being competitive. During qualifying at the season-opener in Australia, their fastest time was almost 1.3 seconds slower than the nearest competitor. In the race, Russell and Kubica finished two and three laps behind the leader respectively. The team's best result of the season came in Germany, where Kubica was classified 10th, the team's only points finish that season. However, this result only came after post-race penalties for other drivers. However, both cars would be eliminated in Q1 at every race of the season. Despite the team's lack of performance in comparison to 2014–2017, it was confirmed that Williams have extended their engine supplier partnership with Mercedes until 2025.

On 19 September 2019, Williams announced that Kubica had decided to leave the team at the end of the 2019 season; he would go on to join Alfa Romeo as a reserve driver. 2019 Formula 2 Championship runner-up Nicholas Latifi was promoted from his role of reserve driver to replace Kubica for the  season. Jack Aitken replaced Latifi as reserve driver. In May 2020, following publication of significant losses in 2019, Williams announced the immediate termination of its title sponsorship deal with ROKiT.

2020–present: Buyout and new management
In the opening race of 2020, the 2020 Austrian Grand Prix, Latifi reached 11th place, just outside the points, whereas in qualifying Russell was only 0.15 seconds away from reaching Q2 (Russell retired in the race with a fuel pressure issue). In the wet qualifying for the next race, the Styrian Grand Prix, Russell succeeded in making it out of Q1, the first time a Williams driver had done so since the 2018 Brazilian Grand Prix, and, in the slippery conditions, qualified in 12th. Russell started the race in 11th, following the application of penalties for other drivers.

At the 2020 Hungarian Grand Prix, both drivers made it out of Q1 for the first time since the 2018 Italian Grand Prix. It was Russell's second time getting out of Q1, and Latifi's first time getting out of Q1.

On 21 August 2020, Williams was acquired by US investment group Dorilton Capital for €152 million. The amount includes settling the debt of the company and it will continue to run under the Williams name and keep its UK base.

Despite being offered the chance to stay on as Team Principal, Claire Williams announced her departure from the team effective after the weekend of the 2020 Italian Grand Prix. Following this announcement, it will be the first time Williams F1 Team has not been under the leadership of the Williams family since its inception 43 years prior. Simon Roberts, who joined Williams from McLaren in May 2020, became the acting team principal of the team. In December 2020, Williams announced Jost Capito will be joining Williams as the new CEO, with Roberts becoming team principal and reporting to Capito.

During the 2021 Monaco Grand Prix, Williams celebrated their 750th Grand Prix start. To celebrate the occasion, Williams launched a competition where the names of 100 Williams supporters were featured on their car, the Williams FW43B, together with the number of races since they started supporting Williams. In June 2021, Roberts left the team. Most of his responsibilities were taken over by Capito, with François-Xavier Demaison taking his trackside leadership duties. The 2021 Hungarian Grand Prix saw Williams score their first points since the 2019 German Grand Prix with Robert Kubica, and their first double points finish since the 2018 Italian Grand Prix. At the 2021 Belgian Grand Prix, Russell qualified in 2nd place and scored Williams' first podium since the 2017 Azerbaijan Grand Prix, as the race was stopped after only two laps under safety car conditions were completed, allowing most drivers to retain their qualifying position. The team also achieved a second consecutive double points finish, as Latifi finished 9th.
Russell scored back-to-back points at the 2021 Italian Grand Prix and at the 2021 Russian Grand Prix (9th and 10th respectively; in the latter he qualified 3rd, behind Carlos Sainz Jr. and pole-sitter Lando Norris). Williams finished in 8th place in the constructors’ championship with 23 points, 10 points ahead of Alfa Romeo, which finished in 9th place.

For the 2022 season, Russell left Williams to join the Mercedes works team, whose junior team he had been a part of. Ex-Red Bull driver, Alex Albon, was signed to replace Russell. Latifi retained his spot in the team. Prior to the season, Williams announced a partnership deal with the battery manufacturer Duracell. Albon scored the teams first points of the season in the Australian Grand Prix, where he pitted only once on the last lap and finished tenth. Albon also finished ninth in the Miami Grand Prix. Latifi achieved his first ever Q3 appearance at the British Grand Prix, though he dropped out the points and finished in twelfth. Following a number of penalties for other drivers at the Belgian Grand Prix, Albon qualified ninth and started sixth. Albon went on to score Williams' third point position finish by ending the race in tenth. Prior to the third practice session at the Italian Grand Prix, Albon withdrew after feeling ill and suffering from appendicitis. Williams announced Nyck de Vries as the replacement. In his first ever qualifying session, de Vries qualified thirteenth, but started eighth after penalties. de Vries went on to finish ninth, scoring points on his debut.

Preceding the start of the 2023 race year, Mercedes ex-chief strategist James Vowles was announced to take over as the Team's new Principal, following the resignation of former Team Principal Jost Capito in 2022.

For the 2023 season, Williams announced a long-term partnership with Gulf Oil.

Williams Group
Williams Grand Prix Holdings is the public company of Williams Group, which includes the Formula One Team and others like Williams Heritage and collaborations with other brands. It was also the former parent company of Williams Hybrid Power & Williams Advanced Engineering. 

It is currently owned by Dorilton Capital. who purchased the team on 21 August 2020. With the acquisition, Claire Williams was offered the chance to stay on as a team principal but that offer was declined. The 2020 Italian Grand Prix in Monza was the last race where the Williams family led the team.

The sale happened after years of financial difficulties. Reuters reported on 20 November 2009 that founders Sir Frank Williams and Patrick Head had sold a minority stake in the team to an investment company led by Toto Wolff. In February 2011, Williams F1 announced plans to raise capital through an initial public offering (IPO) on the Frankfurt Stock Exchange (FWB) in March 2011, with Sir Frank Williams remaining the majority shareholder and team principal after the IPO.

In December 2017 Sir Frank Williams owned 51.3% of the company, with 24.1% on the public marketplace, Brad Hollinger owning 11.7%, Patrick Head 9.3%, and 3.6% is held by an employee trust fund. However in May 2020, Williams was put up for sale after posting a £13 million loss in the previous year.

Williams Heritage

Williams Heritage (WH) is the retired chassis and restoration division of Williams F1 (similar to Ferrari F1 Clienti and Classic Team Lotus) that keeps and maintains old retired Williams Formula One chassis that are no longer in racing use. The division's headquarters are located at the Formula One team's site in Grove, Oxfordshire. Williams Heritage manage the restorations, maintenance and on-track activities of the entire Williams collection, as well as privately owned Williams cars. The division was created by Jonathan Williams and is managed by heritage team manager, Tom Morton.

Williams Driver Academy

Like most F1 teams, Williams operates its own driver academy. They currently have five drivers in their programme. 

Current drivers within the Driver Academy are Jamie Chadwick (W Series Champion 2019, 2021, 2022), Roy Nissany, Logan Sargeant (Williams F1 driver 2023), Zak O'Sullivan, Oliver Gray and Franco Colapinto.

Former drivers include Lance Stroll (who currently races for Aston Martin in Formula One), Oliver Rowland (who currently races for Mahindra in Formula E), Nicholas Latifi, Dan Ticktum, and Jack Aitken.

Williams Experience Centre
The Williams Experience Centre is located at the home of the Williams Formula 1 team in Grove, Oxfordshire.
Originally the base of BMW's Le Mans project, the building was converted in 2002 and today stands as an award-winning Experience Centre, offering event rooms catering and in-house AV facilities.

Other motorsports activities

Formula Two

Williams developed the car for the revived Formula Two championship, beginning in 2009. The design was originally created for a new, more-powerful offshoot of the Formula Palmer Audi series, however the car was re-purposed when Jonathan Palmer's MotorSport Vision successfully bid for the rights to run the new Formula Two series.

Group B rallying (1985–1986)

The Metro 6R4 rally car was developed by Williams in 1984 on commission from Rover. The rally car was a MG Metro with a completely new V6 engine (mid-engined) and four-wheel drive, developed to the international Group B rallying regulations. Williams developed the car in just six months.

British Touring Car Championship (1995–1999)
Williams entered the British Touring Car Championship in 1995, taking over the works Renault programme. Alain Menu transferred from Renault Dealer Racing, with Will Hoy signed to partner him. Williams employed Ian Harrison, future director of Triple Eight Racing as team manager. While Menu was a championship contender, Hoy had constant failures and bad luck during the first half of the season. However, Hoy's luck changed and he won three races and scored several podium finishes in the second half of the year, eventually taking fourth in the championship while Menu finished second in the championship with seven wins. Renault won the manufacturers championship. 1996 was a more difficult year with the front-wheel-drive cars outclassed by the 4WD Audi A4s of Frank Biela and John Bintcliffe. Menu was second in the championship again, while Hoy finished a lowly ninth. 1997 was a breakthrough year for Williams, winning the drivers' championship with Menu, the manufacturers' trophy and teams' award. Other changes for the team saw Jason Plato replacing Hoy, taking third in the championship. The team won 15 races out of 24 in 1997. It also competed in the 1997 Bathurst 1000 with Menu and Plato leading for much of the early part of the race. Alan Jones drove the second car, his first appearance for Williams since 1981.

1998 saw few changes to the Williams team: the driver line-up was unchanged with Menu to defend his title alongside Plato, but the main sponsor for 1998 was Nescafé, with Renault still putting sponsorship in for the team. While the Renaults had a new look for 1998, the opposition had caught up after 1997, and both Menu and Plato had a more difficult season, finishing fourth and fifth in the championship. In the final round of 1998 at Silverstone, a third car was entered for Independents Champion Tommy Rustad. Renault ultimately finished third in the manufacturers trophy and second in the teams championship. 1999 was the most difficult season for Williams, as Menu left Renault after racing with them since 1993. Plato was joined by Jean-Christophe Boullion. Nescafé were again the main sponsor for the Williams team in 1999. Renault did not have much luck in 1999 with engine failures haunting the team during the mid-part of the season. One win for Plato was the only success for the season, and Renault pulled out of the BTCC at the end of the season.

Le Mans 24 Hours and Sportscars (1998–2000)

Prior to their F1 partnership, Williams Motorsport built Le Mans Prototypes for BMW, known as the V12 LM and V12 LMR. The V12 LMR won the 24 Hours of Le Mans in 1999. The car was driven by Pierluigi Martini, Yannick Dalmas and Joachim Winkelhock, and operated by Schnitzer Motorsport under the name of BMW Motorsport.

Formula E

Williams's Advanced Engineering division collaborated with Jaguar Racing in its debut season. Williams have a contract to supply the battery system for the Gen 3 Car from the 2021–22 Formula E World Championship.

Automobile activities

Jaguar C-X75

In May 2011 Jaguar announced a limited production of the C-X75 from 2013 to 2015, with a compact, forced induction petrol engine combined with electric motors instead of the micro gas turbines in the concept car. A maximum of 250 cars were planned to be built in partnership with Williams Advanced Engineering. The Jaguar C-X75 is a hybrid-electric, 2-seat, concept car produced by British automobile manufacturer  Jaguar Cars in partnership with the derivative of the Formula One team, Williams Advanced Engineering which debuted at the 2010 Paris Motor Show.

Renault Clio Williams

The Williams name and logo were used on the Renault Clio Williams, a limited sports model of the production supermini, which was Formula One's safety car at the 1996 Argentine Grand Prix.
However, no input was provided by Williams into the development of the car.

Porsche 911 GT3R Hybrid

Through subsidiary Williams Hybrid Power, the company developed and supplied a flywheel-based kinetic-energy storage system which was in use on a Porsche 911 GT3 R car in various GT racing series. The car achieved its first victory on 28 May 2011 at the 4th round of the VLN Endurance Racing Championship held at the Nürburgring.

Former Subsidiaries

Williams Advanced Engineering

Williams Advanced Engineering (WAE) is the technology and engineering services business of the Williams Group.

The company provides the battery technology used in Formula E and Extreme E, and has assisted the development of the electric Vanda Dendrobium car from Singapore. It has worked with Jaguar to create the C-X75 hybrid supercar. WAE partnered once again with Jaguar to build new stunt C-X75s for the 24th James Bond film, Spectre.

WAE announced in June 2013 a new collaboration with Nismo, the performance-orientated brand of Nissan, to partner in the development of high-performance road cars.

The company announced in August 2017 a collaboration with Singer Vehicle Design. The initial work is a modified, naturally aspirated, air-cooled, flat-six Porsche 911 engine with a 4.0L capacity, four valves per cylinder and four camshafts, rated at 500HP.

On 1 May 2019, Williams Advanced Engineering announced their partnership with the FIA sanctioned electric off-road racing series, Extreme E. Williams Advanced Engineering will supply the batteries for the first two seasons of Extreme E, which began in 2021.

On 2 May 2019, it was announced that Williams Advanced Engineering will supply the batteries for the multi-make ETCR series that is due to launch in 2020.

On 24 January 2022, the Australian mining firm Fortescue Metals Group announced it would be purchasing Williams Advanced Engineering for £164m in an effort to meet its carbon neutral targets for 2030.

WAE generated revenues of £10.9m in fiscal year 2014–15, with profits of £1m.

Williams Hybrid Power
Williams Hybrid Power (WHP) was the division of Williams F1 that developed electromechanical flywheels for mobile applications such as buses, trams and high-performance endurance-racing cars. A hybrid system that uses a spinning composite rotor to store energy, these flywheels help a vehicle save fuel and ultimately reduce its CO2 emissions.

WHP was first established in 2008 and immediately set about developing a new flywheel energy-recovery system for the Williams F1 Team after the introduction of Kinetic Energy Recovery Systems (KERS) into Formula One for the 2009 season. While other teams were pouring their efforts into electric battery systems, Williams F1 opted to go down the flywheel route because of a strong belief in the technology's wider applications. While it was never raced in Formula One due to technical changes, WHP has since seen its technology adapted for a range of applications. For example, the Audi R18 hybrid car that won the 2012 Le Mans 24 Hours used a WHP flywheel. WHP has also seen its flywheel technology introduced into a series of buses as part of a deal with the Go-Ahead Group, one of the UK's biggest transport operators. In April 2014, Williams Hybrid Power was sold to GKN.

Formula One results

 Constructors' Championships winning percentage: 
 Drivers' Championships winning percentage: 
 Winning percentage:

Drivers' Champions

The following drivers won the Formula One Drivers' Championship for Williams:
  Alan Jones
  Keke Rosberg
  Nelson Piquet
  Nigel Mansell
  Alain Prost
  Damon Hill
  Jacques Villeneuve

Notes

References

Sources

 grandprix.com
 formula1.com (archive)
 castrol.com
Williams History (1967–2000) Taken from:
 Williams Team History 1967–77
 Williams Team History 1977–88
 Williams Team History 1996–2000
 Williams Team Profiles 
All Formula One race and championship results are taken from:
 Formula1.com – 1975 – present Archive. Retrieved 12 July 2006

External links

 

1977 establishments in the United Kingdom
 
Formula One entrants
British Touring Car Championship teams
British auto racing teams
British racecar constructors
Companies based in Oxfordshire
Companies listed on the Frankfurt Stock Exchange
Formula One World Constructors' Champions